The Battle of Tricamarum took place on December 15, 533 between the armies of the Byzantine Empire, under Belisarius, and the Vandal Kingdom, commanded by King Gelimer, and his brother Tzazon. It followed the Byzantine victory at the Battle of Ad Decimum, and eliminated the power of the Vandals for good, completing the reconquest of North Africa under the Byzantine Emperor Justinian I. The main contemporary source for the battle is Procopius, De Bello Vandalico, which occupies Books III and IV of his magisterial Wars of Justinian.

Prelude
After the great Byzantine victory at the Battle of Ad Decimum, Belisarius and his army captured Carthage. He knew that in his current state he would not be able to face Belisarius's forces, so he sent messengers to his brother Tzazon who was then campaigning in Sardinia. When he received the message, Tzazon set about returning to Africa to join Gelimer.

Meanwhile, Gelimer also attempted to divide the forces helping Belisarius. He offered rewards to the local Punic and Berber tribes for every Byzantine head they could bring, and sent agents to Carthage to attempt to have the Byzantine Hun mercenaries—vital to his success at Ad Decimum—betray him.

Tzazon and his army joined Gelimer early in December, at which point Gelimer felt his forces were strong enough to take the offensive. With the two brothers at the head of the army, the Vandal force paused on the way to Carthage to destroy the great aqueduct which supplied the city with most of its water.

Belisarius had fortified the city in the twelve weeks since Ad Decimum, but knew about Gelimer's agents and could no longer trust the Huns in his forces. Instead of waiting for a possible treachery during a siege, he formed up his army and marched out with the cavalry at the front, the Byzantines in the center, and the Huns at the rear of the column.

Battle
The Byzantine infantry then furiously attacked the Vandal infantry, and the Byzantines gained the advantage. During the third Byzantine cavalry charge Tzazon was killed within sight of Gelimer. As had happened at Ad Decimum, Gelimer lost heart. The Vandal lines began to retreat, and soon were in rout. Gelimer fled back into Numidia with what remained of his army, having lost 800 men. Belisarius then marched on the city of Hippo Regius, which opened its gates to him.

Aftermath
Gelimer realized that his kingdom was lost, and attempted to flee to Spain, where some Vandals still remained, not having followed the main forces when they crossed into North Africa years earlier. However, the Byzantines heard of his plans and intercepted him. He was forced to abandon his belongings and take refuge in the mountains of Tunis with the Berbers. The next year he was found and surrounded by Roman forces led by Pharas the Herulian. At first he refused to surrender, even after promises of being allowed to rule. After a particularly nasty winter, he eventually gave up and surrendered to Belisarius. The Vandal Kingdom ended, and their provinces in Sardinia, Corsica, and the Balearic Islands came under the control of Justinian.

Importance
Paul K. Davis writes, "With this victory, the Byzantines regained control of North Africa for the Eastern Roman Empire. This position became a springboard for the Byzantine invasion of Italy, and that invasion reincorporated, temporarily, the Eastern and Western Roman Empire."

References

Sources

533
Tricamarum
Tricamarum
Tricamarum
530s in the Byzantine Empire
Tricamarum
Tricamarum